Uncommon Valor is a 1983 American action war film directed by Ted Kotcheff and starring Gene Hackman, Fred Ward, Reb Brown, Randall "Tex" Cobb, Robert Stack, Patrick Swayze, Harold Sylvester and Tim Thomerson. Hackman plays a former U.S. Marine colonel who puts together a rag-tag team to rescue his son, who he believes is among those still held in Laos after the Vietnam War.

Plot
In 1972, a group of soldiers in Vietnam carry one of their wounded during the platoon's evacuation to the helicopters, but they are left behind as the helicopter carrying "Blaster", "Sailor", and Wilkes departs the hot landing zone.

In the early 1980s, retired Marine Colonel Jason Rhodes is obsessed with finding his son Frank, an Army Lieutenant listed as "missing in action" since 1972. After 10 years of searching Southeast Asia and turning up several leads, Rhodes believes that Frank is still alive and being kept in Laos as a prisoner of war.

After petitioning the United States government for help, but receiving none, Colonel Rhodes brings together a disparate group of Vietnam War veterans, including some who were a part of Frank's platoon: the demolitions expert Blaster; the "tunnel rat" Wilkes who suffers from PTSD; and the machine gunner Sailor. Additionally, two helicopter pilot acquaintances of Rhodes, Distinguished Flying Cross recipient Johnson, and Charts, join the group. Former Force Recon Marine Kevin Scott joins the team and later turns out to be the son of a pilot who was shot down in Vietnam and listed as MIA.

With the financial backing of good friend and rich oil businessman McGregor, whose son served in Frank's platoon and is also listed among the missing, the men train near Galveston, Texas in preparation to undertake a rescue mission at a remote POW camp in Laos. As the team arrives in Southeast Asia, the CIA, fearing an international crisis from Rhodes' actions, intercepts him in Bangkok and confiscates his weapons and equipment.

Still determined to rescue their comrades, the team members put together their expense money given to them by McGregor to purchase replacement weapons and supplies. Rhodes contacts an acquaintance, deposed local drug baron Jiang, who joins the expedition with his two daughters Lai Fun and Mai Lin. Jiang manages to supply them with outdated but capable World War II-era weapons. In the course of the expedition, Charts gradually forms a relationship with Lai Fun.

Near the Laotian border, the group is attacked by a border patrol unit and Mai Lin is killed. Later, the group divides: Rhodes leads Charts, Sailor, Johnson, and Lai Fun as the "air team" to a helicopter compound to secure escape transportation, while Jiang, Blaster, Scott, and Wilkes scout out the prison camp as the "ground team." The ground team later discovers four Americans among the prisoners, but are unable to ascertain Frank's whereabouts.

The teams spend the night preparing before commencing the attack the next morning. Blaster sets up demolition charges, while Rhodes and his team discover that the air base is not where they expected it to be. Hiking through the jungle, they find it, get the choppers and take off, but are late in arriving at the camp. Blaster makes the decision to blow his charges to prevent the prisoners from leaving the camp, even though the choppers haven't arrived. In a heated battle, they manage to spring the prisoners, among them McGregor's son, but Frank is not among them; Blaster, Jiang, and Sailor are killed in the process.

From McGregor's son, Rhodes learns that Frank became ill soon after his capture and died. It is revealed that Frank was the soldier who stopped to carry a wounded McGregor during the platoon's evacuation to the helicopters in 1972.

Stateside, the group is joyously welcomed by their families with media attention and fanfare.

Cast

 Gene Hackman as Colonel Rhodes
 Fred Ward as Wilkes
 Reb Brown as Blaster
 Randall "Tex" Cobb as Sailor
 Patrick Swayze as Kevin Scott
 Harold Sylvester as Johnson
 Tim Thomerson as Charts
 Robert Stack as Harry MacGregor
 Kwan Hi Lim as Jiang
 Lau Nga Lai as Lai Fun
 Gail Strickland as Helen Rhodes
 Jerry Kemp as Ferryman
 Charles Aidman as Senator Hastings
 Debi Parker as Mai Ling
 Jane Kaczmarek as Mrs. Wilkes
Other notable appearances include Michael Dudikoff as Blaster's assistant,Constance Forslund as Mrs. Charts, Todd Allen as Frank Rhodes, Don Mantooth as a POW, Tad Horino as Mr. Ky, Gloria Stroock as Mrs. MacGregor, Jan Triska as Gericault, and Barret Oliver as a kid.

Production
The film began with a screenplay by actor Wings Hauser, who says he was inspired by the stories of a childhood friend, Gary Dickerson, who had been to Vietnam. "I saw that he had left something behind in Viet Nam and that triggered the whole thing," said Hauser. "And then I became aware of the MIA and the POW situation and said well that will be the excuse to go back to Nam 
and gel the POWs, but what they’re really going back for is their own clarity and their own integrity right? And that’s the story. That’s the whole film."

Hauser says it took a 18 months to write the script which he sold to Paramount. The film had at least five title changes, including Last River to Cross.

John Milius became attached as producer. The script was rewritten by Joe Gayton. Hauser lost screenplay credit in arbitration. In 1989, Hauser said, "John Milius is a scumbag right-wing bastard and I can't wait for his day to die! That son of a bitch! The (other) guy who got the credit, he was a punk! I don't think he’s sold anything since and I have and he's a joke!"

Paramount sent Gayton's script to director Ted Kotcheff late in January, 1983. The following month it came out that James Gritz, a former lieutenant colonel in the Green Berets (and the man that both the characters Rambo and Hannibal Smith are based on), had led a secret mission into Laos the previous November to search for MIA American soldiers which ended when they were ambushed by Laotian soldiers. Kotcheff said "We assiduously avoided anything in our story similar to Gritz. Our research amazingly showed there were some 30 groups training for similar missions."

Kotcheff said that Milius did write "two or three scenes" as well as making "a number of very creative suggestions" on the script. Among the scenes Milius wrote included one where Hackman gives a speech to the other soldiers about Vietnam being like a company that has gone bankrupt. "It was a wonderful speech," said Kotcheff, adding Milius "did write under pressure but mainly he functioned as a producer."

Milius said he wanted James Arness to play the lead role rather than Gene Hackman.

Filming
Filming started June 6, 1983. The Laotian POW camp that forms the climax of the film was built on a private ranch in the Lumahai Valley on the island of Kauai, Hawaii, and was filmed in early August, 1983. The opening scene depicting the Vietnam War was filmed a short distance away in a rice paddy, two miles from central Hanalei, Hawaii, and 200 yards from the Kuhio Highway (Route 56). Additional parts of the film were shot in Salt Lake City, Utah, Sun Valley, California, and Castaic, California (which served as the training camp).

The helicopters used in the film were purchased (as opposed to rented) and repainted, since the United States Department of Defense was unwilling to rent out the production military-spec Bell UH-1N Huey or Bell 206B Jet Ranger helicopters due to the apparent "anti-government" nature of the film.

Milius hired a composer without Paramount's consent and studio chief Jeffrey Katzenberg overruled Milius.

Marketing
Paramount had originally prepared an advertising campaign that was "factual and rather somber and centred on the plight of prisoners of war", according to one report. However after the marketing department saw the film they decided to create an entirely new campaign. The poster showed a moment invented for the campaign with a soldier (McGregor's son) being carried by another soldier (Sailor) with the copy line, "C'mon, buddy, we're going home." "We were looking to appeal to males on an emotional level," said Paramount's head of marketing, Gordon Weaver. "We were offering them an attainable fantasy. We'd all like to think that we can be heroes, that we would leave our jobs and families to do something really terrific for our friends."

Reception

Box office
The film was a box-office hit, one of the top-earning films of 1983. This was considered a surprise at the time because of the film's lack of stars and the fact it had to compete with Scarface and Sudden Impact. Gordon Weaver, Paramount's president of marketing, thought the film "was successful because of the emotional impact of the ending. The emotional ending really makes you feel terrific."

Kotcheff said "If we knew the secret of a film's success, we'd all be very wealthy. But I think it's partly the strong emotional tug of the father-son relationship."

Critical response
Critical reception of the film was mixed, with a 60% rating on Rotten Tomatoes based on reviews from 10 critics.

Gene Siskel and Roger Ebert of This Week at the Movies: The Movie Review Program both gave the film a thumbs down. In his Chicago Sun-Times review of Uncommon Valor, Ebert gave the film a mixed 2-out-of-4 star review that described the squandering of "first-rate talent" like Kotcheff and Hackman in a film that was little more than "two hours of clichés" delivered with "lead-footed predictability".

See also
 Joint POW/MIA Accounting Command
 Vietnam War POW/MIA issue
 National League of Families
 Operation Homecoming

References

External links

1983 films
Vietnam War films
1980s action war films
American war adventure films
American action war films
American action adventure films
Paramount Pictures films
Films set in Houston
Films directed by Ted Kotcheff
Vietnam War POW/MIA issues
Films about the United States Marine Corps
Films scored by James Horner
Films shot in Utah
Films shot in Hawaii
Films produced by Buzz Feitshans
1980s English-language films
1980s American films
Films set in Laos